The Vancouver Film Critics Circle Award for Best Actress in a Canadian Film is an annual award given by the Vancouver Film Critics Circle. In 2000 and 2001 the award was only given to Canadian actresses, the last few years every actress in a Canadian production can win the award.

Winners

2000s

2010s

2020s

References

Vancouver Film Critics Circle Awards
Film awards for lead actress